AFSP may refer to:

 Annual Filing Season Program, the United States IRS continuing education program for tax return preparers
 American Foundation for Suicide Prevention